is a town located in Aki District, Kōchi Prefecture, Japan.

Geography 
Tōyō is located in northeastern tip of Kōchi Prefecture on the island of Shikoku. It is situated on a mountainous area of the ria coast of the Pacific Ocean, with the main urban area being  strip of hamlets along the coastal highway. Much of the town is within the borders of the Muroto-Anan Kaigan Quasi-National Park.

Neighbouring municipalities 
Kōchi Prefecture
 Muroto
Kitagawa
Tokushima Prefecture
  Kaiyō

Climate
Tōyō has a humid subtropical climate (Köppen climate classification Cfa) with hot summers and cool winters. Precipitation is high, but there is a pronounced difference between the wetter summers and drier winters.

Demographics
Per Japanese census data, the population of Tōyō has been decreased rapidly since the 1960s.

History 
As with all of Kōchi Prefecture, the area of Tōyō was part of ancient Tosa Province. The name of Aki District appears in Nara period . During the Edo period, the area was part of the holdings of Tosa Domain ruled by the Yamauchi clan from their seat at Kōchi Castle. The villages of Kannoura (甲浦村) and None (野根村) were established with the creation of the modern municipalities system on October 1, 1889. Kannoura was raised to town status on April1, 1916, followed by None on February 11, 1938. The two towns merged on July 1, 1959 to form the town of Tōyō.

In 2007, Yasuoki Tashima, the former mayor of the town, brought national and worldwide attention when he applied to host Japan's high level nuclear waste repository in Tōyō without the knowledge or approval of the town assembly. The plan was met with resistance from the town council, the governors of both and Kōchi and Tokushima Prefecture, as well as outrage by local residents. He lost a subsequent election and resigned.

Government
Tōyō has a mayor-council form of government with a directly elected mayor and a unicameral town council of nine members. Tōyō, together with the city of Muroto, contributes one member to the Kōchi Prefectural Assembly. In terms of national politics, the town is part of Kōchi 1st district of the lower house of the Diet of Japan.

Economy
In addition to the commercial fishery industry, Tōyō's economy is centered on forestry and fruit tree cultivation. In the past, bonito fishing and whaling were important, but now the main fishing industry is coastal fishing. The upper reaches of the None River are rainy areas and are noted for wood production.

Education
Tōyō has two public elementary schools and two public middle schools operated by the town government. The town does not have a high school.

Transportation

Railway
The Asa Kaigan Railway's Asatō Line passed through the town, but its terminus, Kannoura Station closed in 2020 when the line was covert from rail to Dual-mode vehicle operations.

Highways

Local attractions
Muroto-Anan Kaigan Quasi-National Park

References

External links

Tōyō official website 

Towns in Kōchi Prefecture
Populated coastal places in Japan